Rodney W. Moore (born July 12, 1963) is an American politician from the state of North Carolina. He is a member of the Democratic Party, and served in the North Carolina House of Representatives, representing the 99th district, until 2019.

Moore first ran for the state House in 2010. He defeated incumbent Democrat Nick Mackey in the primary election, and won the seat in the general election.

In March 2019, Moore was indicted on nine felony counts involving filing false campaign reports; investigators stated that he failed to report more than $141,000 in campaign contributions and expenditures. He pleaded guilty to one felony charge of making false statements under oath and was sentenced to probation.

Moore is African-American.

Electoral history

2022

2018

2016

2014

2012

2010

References

External links
 

Living people
1963 births
Place of birth missing (living people)
20th-century African-American people
21st-century American politicians
21st-century African-American politicians
African-American state legislators in North Carolina
North Carolina politicians convicted of crimes
Democratic Party members of the North Carolina House of Representatives